Jack Revill, better known as Jackmaster (born 11 January 1986), is a Scottish DJ and Producer from Glasgow. He is a co-founder of the record label and club night Numbers as well as Wireblock, Dress 2 Sweat, Point.One Recordings, Seldom Felt and TDSR. Revill was the subject of controversy in August 2018, after he overdosed on GHB and subsequently attempted to "kiss and grab people against their will" at Love Saves The Day Festival in Bristol.

He is renowned for his in-depth and diverse music taste and ability to mix a multitude of different genres. He is one of a few examples of a DJ known primarily as a DJ (rather than a producer), alongside Hessle Audio’s Ben UFO and Rinse FM's Oneman.

Career
Revill was taught to DJ by his best friend Calum Morton (a.k.a. Spencer) at the age of 13 and spent much of his teenage years DJing in bars and clubs around Glasgow - by the time Revill was 17 he was a resident at Glasgow techno institution Monox and promoting his own club-nights alongside Spencer.

He began working at the world-renowned record shop Rubadub in Glasgow at the age of 14 where, rather than asking for money he was paid one record per hours work, though - after leaving school at 16 - he began working full at time at Rubadub distribution. It was while working at the shop that Revill was given the nickname Jackmaster in reference to the popular term "Jackmaster" coined in the Chicago House music scene in the late 80s.

He adopted the alias Jackmaster as his DJ moniker in slots on local radio station Radio Magnetic with early mentor Claude Young from Detroit. At the time he had no DJ name and asked to use his birth name, but Claude and Spencer advised he used the name Jackmaster and it stuck.

Revill was awarded ‘Breakthrough DJ’ at DJ Magazines Best Of British Awards in 2010.

In 2011, after his Numbers label hosted a series of parties at fabric nightclub in London, Revill was asked by the London clubbing institution to mix and curate FabricLive.57. The mix was received with critical acclaim receiving 4.5 out of 5 on Resident Advisor.

Revill has played at a number of clubbing institutions such as fabric, Circo Loco at DC10, The Warehouse Project, Output, Berghain, Trouw and Sub Club, as well as festivals such as Glastonbury Festival, Unknown, Lost Village Festival, Dekmantel, Bestival, T In The Park and Dimensions Festival.

He curated a diverse lineup of acts that included Moodymann, Joy Orbison, Tale Of Us, Dance Mania and DJ Slimzee.

In December 2014 Revill was voted 'Best DJ' in the DJ Magazine Best of British Awards as well as coming 11th in Resident Advisors prestigious 'Top 100 DJs of 2014' poll, a poll where he came 5th and 2nd in the following years. He also embarked upon a highly prestigious residency slot on BBC Radio 1 in August of the same year, joining other DJs such as Grimes, James Blake and Bonobo.

In November 2016 Revill was awarded the SSE Scottish Music Awards Sub Club Electronic Music Award. Making him the first winner of the new category within the historic and prestigious Scottish Music Awards. His victory came as part of an event organised to raise funds for Scotland's only music therapy charity, Nordoff Robbins.

In April 2017 Revill was awarded the Tennents Golden Can Award for Contributions to Scottish Culture, placing him beside Scottish legends such as author Irvine Welsh and footballer Andy Robertson.

Record labels
Revill has set up a number of record labels; the first of which, Point.One Recordings, was an electro label set up in 2006 with the intention to release the first works by Warp Records recording artist Rustie under the Voltaic alias.  Following this Revill founded Dress 2 Sweat in 2007, a vinyl label that focused predominantly on Baltimore club and various other strains of Ghetto Music emerging from the United States.

A year later, Revill and good friend Calum Morton, along with Calum’s brother Neil, formed Wireblock records which saw releases from Hudson Mohawke and Rustie in the early stages of their career before they signed to Warp Records, as well as personal heroes such a Rome's Lory D.

Numbers

The Numbers record label was formed in 2010 with the combining of the three labels, Wireblock, Dress 2 Sweat and Stuffrecords. Wireblock being run by Revill and brothers Calum and Neil Morton; Dress 2 Sweat run by Jack Revill alone; and Stuffrecords by Richard Chater. The first release by Numbers was "If U Want Me" by Deadboy, and it has since released records by Jamie xx, Mosca, Redinho and Sophie.

In 2013 Numbers, along with Dedbeat, started a weekender festival called 'Pleasure Principle’.

Sexual assault controversy
Revill was the subject of controversy in August 2018, after he overdosed on GHB  and subsequently attempted to "kiss and grab people against their will" at Love Saves The Day Festival in Bristol.

Following this, he quickly privately apologized to those offended. Love Saves The Day made the following statement: "The position of the festival and its staff who were affected by Jack's behavior on the night is that Jack has directly apologized to them, he's taken time out to work on himself and undertaken to never repeat this behaviour towards anyone else in future. He has our staff and the festival's support in working towards these aims and his own future happiness."

He subsequently pulled out of multiple lineups to focus on his recovery. Revill has accepted responsibility for his actions and has repeatedly spoken publicly about how "It Was All My Fault" and how "talking about my experiences is one of the first steps towards reaching one of my goals I set myself during recovery, which is to use my voice for good, and my voice to help others".

Discography

DJ mixes
2006: Numbers #001 - 60 Minutes of Numbers Episode #01 / From Paris To Baltimore Via Detroit 
2006: Numbers #006 - 60 Minutes Of Numbers Episode #05 / Mastermix #2
2011: Resident Advisor Podcast 289
2011: FabricLive.57
2014: XLR8R Podcast 366 (28 Oct 2014)
2016: DjKicks Jackmaster

References

Living people
1986 births
Musicians from Glasgow
Scottish DJs
Electronic dance music DJs